Imperial Council may refer to:
 Imperial Council (Austria) (1867–1918), was the parliament of the Cisleithanian part of the Austro-Hungarian Empire
 Imperial Council (Ottoman Empire), the government of the Ottoman Empire until 1908
 State Council of Imperial Russia, was the supreme state advisory body to the Tsar in Imperial Russia